Rick Leach and Jim Pugh were the defending champions, but did not participate this year.

Javier Sánchez and Balázs Taróczy won in the final 7–6, 6–7, 7–6, against Peter Doohan and Laurie Warder.

Seeds
All seeds receive a bye into the second round.

Draw

Finals

Top half

Bottom half

External links
 Draw

1989 Grand Prix (tennis)
1989 BMW Open